Ogueta is a short Basque pelota fronton located in Vitoria, in Álava Province, Basque Country, Spain

History
Ogueta was built in 1979 for the need of a high capacity fronton for the important events of professional pelota. It's named after José María Palacios Moraza, considered to be the best pelotari born in Álava.

Modalities 
The main modalities played in the fronton are Hand-pelota and Paleta-rubber.
Despite that Ogueta has a bigger capacity than Atano III, were played only two 1st Hand-pelota championship finals. It's the usual fronton used for the Doubles-pelota and Cuatro y Medio championships.

Doubles-pelota championship finals
Total: 7

1st Hand-Pelota championship finals
Total: 2

Cuatro y Medio championship finals 
Total: 13

Fronton (court)
Basque pelota
Sport in Vitoria-Gasteiz
Sports venues in the Basque Country (autonomous community)
1979 establishments in Spain
Sports venues completed in 1979
Basque pelota in Spain
es:Frontón Atano III
ca:Frontó Ogueta